KROM (92.9 FM) is a Regional Mexican radio station in San Antonio, Texas. It is owned by Univision Radio. Its studios are located in Northwest San Antonio, and the transmitter site is in Elmendorf, Texas.

History of 92.9 FM

92.9 FM went on the air as KONO-FM in 1947, becoming KITY in 1960. The station had a middle-of-the-road format for its first 25 years until flipping to country in 1973. The station changed directions in 1973 with a flip to country, and again in 1974 when it adopted an adult contemporary format as "KITY, The Music FM Stereo 93".

From 1979 to 1990, KITY programmed a "churban" crossover CHR/urban (rhythmic CHR) format, which was known as "Power 93" after 1986.

On September 3, 1990, KITY returned to adult contemporary as KSRR "Star 93". At the time, it was owned by Booth American's West Coast division, Genesis Broadcasting; when all of Booth's Texas stations were divested when Booth merged with Broadcast Alchemy to form Secret Communications, Tichenor Media bought KSRR for $3.8 million. Tichenor, a specialist in Hispanic broadcasting, relaunched KSRR as Spanish AC outlet "Éxitos en Español, KSRR FM 92.9" on March 27, 1993; later that year, it flipped completely to romantic as La Romántica with new KROM call letters.

In 1995, KROM flipped to Regional Mexican as Estéreo Latino. The station rebranded as Qué Buena in March 2016.

References

External links
KROM official website

ROM
Univision Radio Network stations